Raboama Koloti (born 4 December 1998) is a  Mosotho footballer currently playing as a forward for Lesotho Mounted Police Service FC of the Lesotho Premier League.

Career statistics

International

International goals
Scores and results list Lesotho's goal tally first.

References

1998 births
Living people
Lesotho footballers
Association football forwards
Lesotho international footballers